Toko Buku Gramedia (Gramedia Bookstore) is an Indonesian bookstore owned by Kompas Gramedia. Established in 1970, Gramedia Asri Media has contributed to give inspiration through knowledge, endeavor and direct participation to society for more than 50 years. Started in February 2, 1970 with the beginning of a small bookstore  in West Jakarta. Providing more than 120 retail stores spread across 53 cities in 33 provinces, Gramedia Asri Media is expanding to have official online sales channels on all major platforms with more than one million active members and continues to grow under the Gramedia brand. Gramedia Asri Media is reinforced by six major publishers which have released more than 100,000 book titles, making Gramedia Asri Media the largest publisher and book retail group in Southeast Asia. In addition to providing books, Gramedia also offers a variety of other products, such as stationery, office supplies, and sports equipment.

Gramedia Bookstores was established by the founder P.K. Ojong since his goal was to distribute books across Indonesia.

References

External links
 Official site 

Bookstores of Indonesia
Indonesian brands
Indonesian companies established in 1970
Kompas Gramedia Group
Retail companies established in 1970